Maciej Krzysztof Jarosz (born 4 March 1959) is a Polish former volleyball player and coach. He was a member of the Poland national team, and a participant of the Olympic Games Moscow 1980. He works as a volleyball commentator.

Personal life
He is the son of Zbigniew Jarosz, a volleyball player, who used to play for Gwardia Wrocław, and Maria Ronczewska, multiple Polish swimming champion. His sons, Jakub (born 1987) and Marcin (born 1980), are also volleyball players.

Honours

As a player
 National championships
 1979/1980  Polish Championship, with Gwardia Wrocław
 1980/1981  Polish Cup, with Gwardia Wrocław
 1980/1981  Polish Championship, with Gwardia Wrocław
 1981/1982  Polish Championship, with Gwardia Wrocław 
 1989/1990  Belgian Championship, with Rembert Torhout

As a coach
 National championships
 1998/1999  Polish Championship, with AZS Częstochowa

External links

 
 
 Player profile at Volleybox.net

1959 births
Living people
Sportspeople from Wrocław
Polish men's volleyball players
Olympic volleyball players of Poland
Volleyball players at the 1980 Summer Olympics
Polish expatriate sportspeople in Belgium
Expatriate volleyball players in Belgium
Gwardia Wrocław players
Stal Nysa players
AZS Częstochowa coaches